The 2008 RoadRunner Turbo Indy 300 was the fourth round of the 2008 IndyCar Series season and took place on April 27, 2008 at the  Kansas Speedway. At the start, Scott Dixon took the lead from the pole position. Meanwhile, Enrique Bernoldi spun and headed to the pits. On lap 23, Will Power crashed in turn 2. While the field pitted under the caution, Justin Wilson stayed out and took the lead. Dixon took the lead back on the restart, and maintained the lead through the next series of pit stops. On lap 98, the caution came out again for a crash involving E. J. Viso and Tomas Scheckter. After another long green flag segment, Buddy Rice brought out the yellow on lap 153 with a heavy crash in turn 2. In the pits, Danica Patrick retired from the race with a broken wheel hub. Meanwhile, Dixon, who had dominated most of the race, was shuffled back to seventh place.

The race resumed after a long yellow with Dan Wheldon leading. Wheldon pulled away and led the final 49 laps to record his first IndyCar Series victory since April 2007.

References 
IndyCar Series (Archived 2009-05-28)

RoadRunner Turbo Indy 300
Kansas Indy 300
RoadRunner Turbo
RoadRunner Turbo Indy 300